The 1935 Kent State Golden Flashes football team was an American football team that represented Kent State University in the Ohio Athletic Conference (OAC) during the 1935 college football season. In its first season under head coach Donald Starn, Kent State compiled a 3–5 record.

Schedule

References

Kent State
Kent State Golden Flashes football seasons
Kent State Golden Flashes football